SM was an American made fighter-direction radar used for the ship ground-controlled interception (GCI) during World War II by the United States Navy. Variation included the SM-1.

SM radar 
Microwave set with three axis stabilized antenna, installed on aircraft carriers to search for enemy planes, particularly low-flying and shadow planes, and to supply height, speed and course data so that a Fighter Director Officer can direct fighters to an interception. Can also be used to search for ships and periscopes. SM is correlated with search sets, such as SK, and with radio communication to planes. Has provisions for A and G-band IFF, and a built-in BO antenna. For night interception, AIA is required in planes.

Periscopes can be seen  or more, and buoys can be seen up to horizon. Range can be determined to ± , or 1/4%, whichever is greater. Bearing can be determined to ± 1/2°. Elevation can be determined to ±1/3° if airplane is 21/2° or more above optical horizon. If plane is lower, data is less reliable. Elevation limit is 90°.

Spares, testing equipment and separate generator supplied. SM has 23 components weighing a total of about 9 tons. Minimum operators per shift required are two, plus one assistant radar officer. Recommended personnel: 15 per day. Power required is 45-65 KW, 440 V 3-phase 60 Hz, supplied by motor generator set, or, in emergencies, from ship's supply.

USS Lexington (CV-16) was equipped with the first prototype of SM radar in March 1943, while USS Enterprise (CV-6) and USS Bunker Hill (CV-17) were equipped with the first two production models in October of the same year. 26 SM-1 variants were all produced and leased to the Royal Navy. SM was developed from the SCR-584 radar.

On board ships

United States 

 Essex-class aircraft carrier
 USS Enterprise (CV-6)
 USS Saratoga (CV-3)

United Kingdom 

 HMS Boxer (F121)

SP radar 
SP or CXDT was the lightweight version of the SM radar. It replaced the SK radar in the later stages of the war.

On board ships

United States 

 Saipan-class aircraft carrier
 Independence-class aircraft carrier
 Commencement Bay-class escort carrier
 Iowa-class battleship
 North Carolina-class battleship
 USS California (BB-44)
 USS Pennsylvania (BB-38)
 Des Moines-class cruiser
 Gearing-class destroyer
 Porter-class destroyer
 Buckley-class destroyer escort
 Adirondack-class command ship
 Mount McKinley-class command ship

France 

 Jean Bart (1940)

See also 

 List of radars
 Radar configurations and types
 Air-search radar

Citations

References 

 Norman Friedman (2006). The Naval Institute Guide to World Naval Weapon Systems.  Naval Institute Press.  
 Buderi, Robert (1998). The Invention That Changed the World: How a Small Group of Radar Pioneers Won the Second World War and Launched a Technical Revolution. Touchstone. 
 Hezlet, Arthur (1975). Electronics and Sea Power. New York: Stein and Day. 

Naval radars
World War II radars
Military equipment introduced from 1940 to 1944
Military radars of the United States